Hares and jackrabbits are mammals belonging to the genus Lepus. They are herbivores, and live solitarily or in pairs. They nest in slight depressions called forms, and their young are able to fend for themselves shortly after birth. The genus includes the largest lagomorphs. Most are fast runners with long, powerful hind legs, and large ears to dissipate body heat. Hare species are native to Africa, Eurasia and  North America. A hare less than one year old is called a "leveret". A group of hares is called a "husk", a "down" or a "drove".

Members of the Lepus genus are considered true hares, distinguishing them from rabbits which make up the rest of the Leporidae family. However, there are five leporid species with "hare" in their common names which are not considered true hares: the hispid hare (Caprolagus hispidus), and four species known as red rock hares (comprising Pronolagus). Conversely, several Lepus species are called "jackrabbits", but classed as hares rather than rabbits. The pet known as the Belgian hare is a domesticated European rabbit which has been selectively bred to resemble a hare.

Biology

 
Normally a shy animal, the European brown hare changes its behavior in spring, when it can be seen in daytime chasing other hares. This appears to be competition between males to attain dominance for breeding. During this spring frenzy, animals of both sexes can be seen "boxing", one hare striking another with its paws. This behavior gives rise to the idiom "mad as a March hare". This is present not only in intermale competition, but also among females toward males to prevent copulation.

Differences from rabbits

Hares are generally larger than rabbits, with longer ears, and have black markings on their fur. Hares, like all leporids, have jointed, or kinetic, skulls, unique among mammals. They have 48 chromosomes, while rabbits have 44. Hares have not been domesticated, while some rabbits are raised for food and kept as pets.

Most rabbits live underground in burrows or warrens, while hares live in simple nests above the ground, and usually do not live in groups. Hares do not bear their young below ground in a burrow as do other leporids, but rather in a shallow depression or flattened nest of grass called a form. Young hares are adapted to the lack of physical protection, relative to that afforded by a burrow, by being born fully furred and with eyes open. They are hence precocial, able to fend for themselves soon after birth. By contrast, rabbits are altricial, being born blind and hairless.

Classification

The 33 species listed are:

 Genus Lepus
 Subgenus Macrotolagus
 Antelope jackrabbit, Lepus alleni
 Subgenus Poecilolagus
 Snowshoe hare, Lepus americanus
 Subgenus Lepus
 Arctic hare, Lepus arcticus
 Alaskan hare, Lepus othus
 Mountain hare, Lepus timidus
 Subgenus Proeulagus
 Black jackrabbit, Lepus insularis
 Desert hare, Lepus tibetanus
 Tolai hare, Lepus tolai
 Subgenus Eulagos
 Broom hare, Lepus castroviejoi
 Yunnan hare, Lepus comus
 Korean hare, Lepus coreanus
 European hare, Lepus europaeus
 Manchurian hare, Lepus mandshuricus
 Ethiopian highland hare, Lepus starcki
 Subgenus Sabanalagus
 Ethiopian hare, Lepus fagani
 African savanna hare, Lepus victoriae
 Subgenus Indolagus
 Hainan hare, Lepus hainanus
 Indian hare, Lepus nigricollis
 Burmese hare, Lepus peguensis
 Subgenus Sinolagus
Chinese hare, Lepus sinensis
 Subgenus Tarimolagus
 Yarkand hare, Lepus yarkandensis
 Incertae sedis
 Tamaulipas jackrabbit, Lepus altamirae
 Japanese hare, Lepus brachyurus
Black-tailed jackrabbit, Lepus californicus
 White-sided jackrabbit, Lepus callotis
 Cape hare, Lepus capensis
 Corsican hare, Lepus corsicanus
 Tehuantepec jackrabbit, Lepus flavigularis
 Granada hare, Lepus granatensis
 Abyssinian hare, Lepus habessinicus
 Woolly hare, Lepus oiostolus
 Scrub hare, Lepus saxatilis
 White-tailed jackrabbit, Lepus townsendii

Food

Meat

Hares and rabbits are plentiful in many areas, adapt to a wide variety of conditions, and reproduce quickly, so hunting is often less regulated than for other varieties of game. In rural areas of North America and particularly in pioneer times, they were a common source of meat. Because of their extremely low fat content, they are a poor choice as a survival food.

Hares can be prepared in the same manner as rabbits—commonly roasted or parted for breading and frying.

 (also spelled ) is a traditional German stew made from marinated rabbit or hare.  here means not only the obvious spicing with pepper and other spices, but also means a dish in which the animal's blood is used as a thickening agent for the sauce. Wine or vinegar is also a prominent ingredient, to lend a sourness to the recipe.

—hare stew with pearl onions, vinegar, red wine, and cinnamon—is a much-prized dish enjoyed in Greece and Cyprus and communities in the diaspora, particularly in Australia, where the hare is hunted as a feral pest.

The hare (and in recent times, the rabbit) is a staple of Maltese cuisine. The dish was presented to the island's Grandmasters of the Sovereign Military Order of Malta, as well as Renaissance Inquisitors resident on the island, several of whom went on to become pope.

According to Jewish tradition, the hare is among mammals deemed not kosher, and therefore not eaten by observant Jews. Muslims deem coney meat (rabbit, pika, hyrax) to be halal, and in Egypt, hare and rabbit are popular meats for mulukhiyah (jute leaf soup), especially in Cairo.

Blood
The blood of a freshly killed hare can be collected for consumption in a stew or casserole in a cooking process known as jugging. First the entrails are removed from the hare carcass before it is hung in a larder by its hind legs, which causes blood to accumulate in the chest cavity. One method of preserving the blood after draining it from the hare (since the hare is usually hung for a week or more) is to mix it with red wine vinegar to prevent coagulation, and then to store it in a freezer.

It traditionally is served with the hare's blood (or the blood is added right at the end of the cooking process) and port wine.

Jugged hare is described in an influential 18th-century English cookbook, The Art of Cookery by Hannah Glasse, with a recipe titled, "A Jugged Hare", that begins, "Cut it into little pieces, lard them here and there ..." The recipe goes on to describe cooking the pieces of hare in water in a jug set within a bath of boiling water to cook for three hours. In the 19th century, a myth arose that Glasse's recipe began with the words "First, catch your hare." 

Many other British cookbooks from before the middle of the 20th century have recipes for jugged hare. Merle and Reitch have this to say about jugged hare, for example:
The best part of the hare, when roasted, is the loin and the thick part of the hind leg; the other parts are only fit for stewing, hashing, or jugging. It is usual to roast a hare first, and to stew or jug the portion which is not eaten the first day. ...
To Jug A Hare. This mode of cooking a hare is very desirable when there is any doubt as to its age, as an old hare, which would be otherwise uneatable, may be made into an agreeable dish.

In 2006, a survey of 2021 people for the UKTV Food television channel found only 1.6% of the people under 25 recognized jugged hare by name. Seven of ten stated they would refuse to eat jugged hare if it were served at the house of a friend or a relative.

In England, a now rarely served dish is potted hare. The hare meat is cooked, then covered in at least one inch (preferably more) of butter. The butter is a preservative (excludes air); the dish can be stored for up to several months. It is served cold, often on bread or as an appetizer.

Taming 
No extant domesticated hares exist. However, hare remains have been found in a wide range of human settlement sites, some showing signs of use beyond simple hunting and eating:
 A European brown hare was buried alongside an older woman in Hungary mid fifth millennium BC.
 12 Mountain hare metapodials were found in a Swedish grave from third millennium BC.
 The Tolai hare (originally described as a Cape hare, amended according to range) was tamed by northern Chinese people in the neolithic period (~third millennium BC) and fed millets.

Folklore and mythology
The hare in African folk tales is a trickster; some of the stories about the hare were retold among enslaved Africans in America, and are the basis of the Br'er Rabbit stories. The hare appears in English folklore in the saying "as mad as a March hare" and in the legend of the White Hare that alternatively tells of a witch who takes the form of a white hare and goes out looking for prey at night or of the spirit of a broken-hearted maiden who cannot rest and who haunts her unfaithful lover.

Many cultures, including the Chinese, Japanese, and Mexican, see a hare in the pattern of dark patches in the moon (see Moon rabbit). The constellation Lepus is also taken to represent a hare.

The hare was once regarded as an animal sacred to Aphrodite and Eros because of its high libido. Live hares were often presented as a gift of love. Now, the hare is commonly associated with the Anglo-Saxon goddess Ēostre, and therefore pagan symbols like the Easter Bunny have been appropriated into the Christian tradition. However, no primary sources support this belief, which seems to be a modern invention.

In European tradition, the hare symbolises the two qualities of swiftness and timidity. The latter once gave the European hare the Linnaean name Lepus timidus that is now limited to the mountain hare. Several ancient fables depict the Hare in flight; in one concerning The Hares and the Frogs they even decide to commit mass suicide until they come across a creature so timid that it is even frightened of them. Conversely, in The Tortoise and the Hare, perhaps the best-known among Aesop's Fables, the hare loses a race through being too confident in its swiftness. In Irish folklore, the hare is often associated with Sidh (Fairy) or other pagan elements. In these stories, characters who harm hares often suffer dreadful consequences.

In fiction

In art

Three hares

A study in 2004 followed the history and migration of a symbolic image of three hares with conjoined ears. In this image, three hares are seen chasing each other in a circle with their heads near its centre. While each of the animals appears to have two ears, only three ears are depicted. The ears form a triangle at the centre of the circle and each is shared by two of the hares. The image has been traced from Christian churches in the English county of Devon right back along the Silk Road to China, via western and eastern Europe and the Middle East. Before its appearance in China, it was possibly first depicted in the Middle East before being reimported centuries later. Its use is associated with Christian, Jewish, Islamic and Buddhist sites stretching back to about 600 CE.

Place names
The hare has given rise to local place names, as they can often be observed in favoured localities. An example in Scotland is 'Murchland', 'murchen' being a Scots word for a hare.

See also

 Lagomorpha

References

Further reading
 Windling, Terri. The Symbolism of Rabbits and Hares.
 William George Black, F.S.A.Scot. "The Hare in Folk-lore" The Folk-Lore Journal. Volume 1, 1883
 Gibbons, J. S., Herbert, K., Lascelles, G., Longman, J. H., Macpherson, H. A., & Richardson, C. 1896. The Hare: Natural history.     
 Palmer, TS. Jack Rabbits of the United States 1896. Washington,: Govt. Print. Off.
 Kane, Eloise C. Beyond the Pale: the historical archaeology of hare hunting, 1603-1831. Diss. University of Bristol, 2021.

External links

 BBC Nature section about hares

 
Meat by animal
Mythological rabbits and hares
 
Taxa named by Carl Linnaeus

hr:Zečevi